{{DISPLAYTITLE:Psi7 Aurigae}}

Psi7 Aurigae, Latinized from ψ7 Aurigae, is a star in the northern constellation of Auriga. It is a dim, naked eye star with an apparent visual magnitude of 5.02.

ψ7 Aurigae is a giant star with a stellar classification of K3 III. At its estimated distance, this yields a physical size of about 24 times the radius of the Sun. The outer envelope has an effective temperature of 4,300, giving it an orange colour and a classification as a K-type star. Although cooler than the sun, its larger size means that it is more luminous, emitting in total 217 times as much electromagnetic radiation.

See also
 Psi Aurigae

References

External links
 HR 2516
 CCDM J06508+4147
 Image Psi7 Aurigae

Auriga (constellation)
K-type giants
Aurigae, Psi07
Aurigae, 58
049520
032844
2516
Durchmusterung objects